The 2023 IBSF European Championships were held from 20 to 22 January 2023 in Altenberg, Germany.

With four gold medals, Germany was the top nation at the European championships as in the years before, and with eleven from eighteen medals, dominated the championships.  However, Great Britain denied the Germans two gold medals in the male events, won on the first and the last event of the championships. This continued a pattern for the season of close competition on the male side between Germany and Great Britain, which would continue in the IBSF World Championships 2023, held later that month. Skeleton racer Matt Weston won his first international title in a competition where Great Britain took three of the first five positions.  It was the first British medal in this competition since 2015.  Two days later Brad Hall and his crew celebrated a first-ever European bobsleigh championship for the British team.  After both runs Hall was nine hundredths of a second quicker than reigning world and Olympic champion in both bobsleighs Francesco Friedrich.  Friedrich, who was still handicapped by a hamstring injury also failed to defend his title in the two-man sled and won the bronce medal.

Schedule 
Six events were held.

All times are local (UTC+1).

Skeleton

Bobsleigh

Medal summary

Medal table

Skeleton

Bobsleigh

See also
 Bobsleigh and Skeleton European Championship

References

European Championships
European Championships
International sports competitions hosted by Germany
Bobsleigh in Germany
Skeleton in Germany
2023 in German sport
Sport in Altenberg, Saxony
January 2023 sports events in Germany